Efrosinya Andreevna Staritskaya née Khovanskaia (1516-1569), was a Russian noblewoman. 

In 1533, she married Prince Andrey of Staritsa, uncle of Tsar Ivan the Terrible.  She was described as ambitious and forceful.  She wished for the Staritsky family to influence the regency of Tsar Ivan, and orchestrated a plot to depose the regent Elena Glinskaya, Ivan’s mother.  She failed, and was imprisoned with her son Vladimir of Staritsa and her spouse, who died in prison.

After the death of regent Elena, Efrosinya returned to court with her son and successfully influenced the Tsar to return the confiscated lands of her spouse.  In 1550, she arranged for her son to marry Evdokia Nagaya, and allied with the Belsky court faction in order to place her son Vladimir on the throne.   She created alliances with boyar families by including them in her household in her principality of Staritsa, and equipped the principality with her own army.   During the illness of Ivan IV in 1553, she actively pressed the claims of her son to the throne.  However, her plot failed as she did not managed to secure support in the Boyar Duma, nor the full cooperation of her son.    In response, she herself kept the seal and control of the family principality and refused to give it to her son even as he was no longer a minor.  When recovered, Ivan IV himself had Vladimir include a promise in his oath not to protect his mother if she was to "plan harm" against him again.  

During the Livonian War, Vladmir was honored for his conduct in Battle and won popularity, which made the tsar fear that Efrosinya would use her son's popularity against him.  In 1563, Efrosinya was arrested and put on trial for alleged conspiracy and sentenced to live in a convent.    She was however allowed to keep her own household in the convent, allowed to make pilgrimage journeys and kept informed of political affairs, and thus the verdict had limited actual effect on her activity.  In 1569, Ivan IV again suspected Vladimir to be the object of plots to place him on the throne, orchestrated by his mother: he gave orders that she be executed, which was performed.

References

16th-century Russian people
16th-century Russian women
1569 deaths